Micropterix schaefferi is a species of moth belonging to the family Micropterigidae that was described by John Heath in 1975. It is known from France, Corsica, Italy, Belgium, the Netherlands, Germany, Switzerland, Austria, Hungary, Czech Republic, Bulgaria, Denmark, and Poland. Moths in this species inhabit woodlands with many beech and coniferous trees, and are also known to inhabit moist ravine forests and dry pine forests.

References

Moths of Europe
Micropterigidae
Moths described in 1975
Taxa named by John Heath